Marianne Duvivier (born 6 March 1958) is a Belgian comic book artist.

Duvivier drew her first comic strips for the fanzine Oxygène. From 1984 to 1987, she drew the strip Stone for the magazine Circus, partnering with writer Jan Bucquoy.

Selected work 
 Lagune, L'abbaye des Dunes (1990), illustrator, written by Jacques de Pierpont
 'Mauvaise Graine, series (1993-2001)
  (2004, 2006) 2 volumes in the series , script by Frank Giroud
 Heureuse vie, heureux combats in the series Secrets'' (2014)

References

External links 
 

1958 births
Living people
Belgian comics artists
Belgian female comics artists